Ralph Tresvant is the debut album by American singer Ralph Tresvant. The album was released by MCA Records on November 20, 1990 in the United States. It went to number one on the Irish Albums Chart for 12 weeks, and on the US Top R&B Albums chart for two weeks and peaked into the top 20 on the  US Billboard 200 chart. It features the number one single, "Sensitivity" along with two more top five R&B hits:  "Do What I Gotta Do" and "Stone Cold Gentleman", which featured labelmate Bobby Brown, and has been certified Platinum by the Recording Industry Association of America (RIAA).

Critical reception

AllMusic editor Alex Henderson found that Tresvant's "self-titled R&B/pop release isn't as distinguished or as confident as the music Bobby Brown, Bell Biv DeVoe and Johnny Gill had been doing on their own, but it has its moments [...]  Some of urban contemporary's hottest producers (Jimmy Jam & Terry Lewis and Wolf & Epic, among others) are employed, and yet, the overall results aren't as strong as one might expect. None of the material is really bad; it's just that most of it isn't that far above average." Ian Cranna in Q Magazine echoed this sentiment noting that the "album is a rather uneasy amalgam of dance grooves, strings, hip hop and lush ballads".

Track listing 

Notes
"Rated R" samples "Masterpiece" as performed by The Temptations.
Rap lyrics on "Stone Cold Gentleman" written by Ralph Tresvant and Bobby Brown.

Personnel
Unless otherwise noted, information based on the CD edition's liner notes

Performance
 Lead vocals (sung by): Ralph Tresvant
 Rap performed by: Bobby Brown (4), Ralph Tresvant
 Background vocals: Ralph Tresvant (1–11), Tabitha Brace (7–8), Cedric "K-Ci" Hailey (7–8), Terri Robinson (7–8), Dewayne Omarr (9), Redg Green (9), Karen Y. Mayo (9), Altitude (9), Deah Dame (6), Richard Wolf (9), Alton "Wokie" Stewart (10), Vassal Benford (11), Sue Ann Carwell (11), Michael Jackson (12)
 All Instruments: Jimmy Jam and Terry Lewis (3, 5), Kyle West (7–8), Timmy Gatling (10), Howie Hersh (10)
 All other instruments: Vassal Benford (11)
 Additional instruments: Jimmy Jam (1–2)

</ref> Terry Lewis (1)
 Drum machine: Jimmy Jam and Terry Lewis (3), L.A. Reid, Kyle West, Timmy Gatling, Vassal Benford, L.A. Jay
 Drums: L.A. Reid (4), Daryl Simmons (6), Kayo (6), Bret "Epic" Mazur (9)
 Percussion: L.A. Reid (4), Daryl Simmons (6), Kayo (6), Ted Thomas (additional on 11)
 Keyboards: Daryl Simmons (4, 6), Richard Wolf (9), Vassal Benford, Jimmy Jam, L.A. Jay, Kyle West
 Synclavier: John Barnes (12)
 Guitar: Richard Wolf (9), Charles Fearing (12)
 Bass played by: Kayo (4, 6)

Production and technical
 Music programming: Bret "Epic" Mazur (9)
 Keyboard programming: Daryl Simmons (4, 6), Kayo (4, 6)
 Vocals programmed by: Jimmy Jam and Terry Lewis (2)
 Musical arrangement: Vassal Benford (11)
 Rhythm arrangement: Jimmy Jam and Terry Lewis (1–3, 5), Daryl Simmons (4, 6), Kayo (4, 6)
 Vocal arrangement: Ralph Tresvant (1), Jimmy Jam and Terry Lewis (1–3, 5), Daryl Simmons (4, 6), Kayo (4), Babyface (6), Vassal Benford (11), Ron Spearman (11)
 Recording engineers: Jimmy Jam and Terry Lewis (1–3), Donnell Sullivan (4, 6), Ron Christopher (4, 6), Barney Perkins (4), Steve Hodge (5), Wade Norton (7–8), Elliott Peters (7–8), Jon Guggenheim (10), John Hedges (11), Larold Rebhun (11), Neal Pogue (11), Jack Rouben (12)
 Assistant engineers: Milton Chan (4), Ted Malia (4, 6), Jim Zumpano (4, 6), David Betancourt (7), Steve Gallagher (7), Tom Twiss (7–8), Derek Marcil (9), Eugene Dixon (12)
 Mixing: Steve Hodge (1–3, 5), David Bianco (4), L.A. Reid (4), Daryl Simmons (4, 6), Kayo (4, 6), Elliott Peters (7–8), Dave Pensado (9), Jon Guggenheim (10), Louil Silas Jr. (12), Peter Arata (12), Skip Saylor
 Mixing assistance: Jim Zumpano (4), Milton Chan (6), David Betancourt (7–8), Steve Gallagher (7–8)
 Mastering: Herb Powers, Jr.

Other
 Art direction: Jeff Adamoff
 Design: Drennon Advertising
 Photography: Carol Friedman

Charts

Weekly charts

Year-end charts

Certifications

See also
List of number-one R&B albums of 1991 (U.S.)

References

1990 debut albums
MCA Records albums
Ralph Tresvant albums
Albums produced by Jimmy Jam and Terry Lewis